Comostola is a genus of moths in the family Geometridae erected by Edward Meyrick in 1888. They are found primarily in Asia and Australia.

Species
Comostola cedilla Prout, 1917 New Guinea, Queensland, southern Moluccas, Sulawesi, Philippines, Borneo, Sumatra, Peninsular Malaysia
Comostola chlorargyra (Walker, 1861) India, Andamans, Borneo, Java, Philippines, Sulawesi
Comostola christinaria Han & Xue, 2009
Comostola citrolimbaria (Guenée, 1857) Australia
Comostola conchylias Meyrick, 1889 New Guinea
Comibaena dispansa Walker, 1861 India
Comostola dyakaria (Walker, 1861) Borneo, Philippines, Sumatra, Peninsular Malaysia, north-eastern Himalayas
Comostola enodata Holloway, 1996 Borneo, Sumatra, Singapore, Sulawesi, New Guinea
Comostola haplophanes Turner, 1910 Australia
Comostola hauensteini Smetacek, 2004 Kumaon
Comostola hypotyphla Prout, 1917 India
Comostola inops Prout, 1912 India
Comostola iodioides (Lucas, 1891) Australia
Comostola laesaria (Walker, 1861) Sri Lanka, India, Indochina, southern China, Taiwan, Sundaland, northern Australia, Bismarck Archipelago
Comostola leucomerata (Walker, 1866) Australia
Comostola maculata (Moore, 1867) India
Comostola meritaria (Walker, 1861) Sri Lanka, Taiwan, Sumatra, Borneo,
Comostola minutata (Druce, 1888) Solomons, Bismarck Archipelago
Comostola mundata Warren, 1896 India
Comostola nereidaria (Snellen, 1881) Sulawesi, Borneo, New Guinea, Bismarck Archipelago
Comostola ocellulata Prout, 1920
Comostola orestias Prout, 1934 Borneo, Peninsular Malaysia
Comostola ovifera (Warren, 1893) India
Comostola prasochroa (Turner, 1931) Australia
Comostola pyrrhogona (Walker, 1866) India, Indochina, southern China, Taiwan, Vanuatu, New Caledonia, northern Australia, Norfolk Island
Comostola rhodoselas (Prout) Samoa, Fiji
Comostola satoi Inoue, 1986
Comostola simplex (Warren) Java
Comostola subtiliaria (Bremer, 1864) south-eastern Siberia, Korea, north-eastern Himalayas, southern China
Comostola turgescens (Prout, 1917) north-eastern Himalayas, Sundaland, Sulawesi
Comostola virago Prout, 1926 India

References

Kandasamy, Gunathilagaraj (2016). "Checklist of Indian Geometridae with FBI number". Tamil Nadu Agricultural University.

Hemitheini
Geometridae